Presidential elections were held in Guinea on 19 December 1993. They were the first since the country returned to multi-party politics in 1990, and the first to feature more than one candidate. The result was a victory for Lansana Conté of the Unity and Progress Party, who received 51.7% of the vote. Voter turnout was 78.5%.

Results

References

Presidential elections in Guinea
Guinea
1993 in Guinea
December 1993 events in Africa